Te doy la vida (English: I Give You My Life) is a 2016 Chilean telenovela created by María José Galleguillos, that premiered on Mega on May 4, 2016 and ended on November 23, 2016. It stars Celine Reymond and Cristián Riquelme.

Plot 
The plot revolves around Fabián Garrido (Cristián Riquelme), a mechanic who works downtown. One day Fabián meets Isidora Valdés (Celine Reymond), a young woman who needs to save her son. It turns out that Fabián is the father of Isidora's son, and he can donate his spinal cord to save the boy. Although Isidora is married to Emilio San Martín (Álvaro Espinoza), a successful lawyer, Fabián slowly begins to fall in love with her and soon she starts to correspond Fabián's feelings.

Cast 
 Celine Reymond as Isidora Graciela Valdés Bianchi
 Cristián Riquelme as Fabián Garrido Maldonado
 Álvaro Espinoza as Emilio San Martín / Luis "Luchin" Martínez
 Carmen Disa Gutierrez as Ester Maldonado
 Gabriel Prieto as Domingo Garrido Mateluna
 Carmen Gloria Bresky as Monica Betania Urriola Fonseca
 Ramón Llao as Nelson Rodríguez
 Cecilia Cucurella as Valeria Bianchi
 Osvaldo Silva as Horacio Valdés
 Constanza Araya as Yoana Rodríguez Norambuena
 Ricardo Vergara as Ayrton Mondaca
 Etienne Bobenrieth as Samuel Garrido Maldonado
 María José Illanes as Daniela Valdes Bianchi
 María de los Ángeles Garcías as Rosa María Chavez
 Carmen Zabala as Gabriela Valdes Bianchi
 León Izquierdo as Nicolás Ignacio San Martín Valdes / Nicolás Garrido Ahumada

Ratings

References

External links 
 

Chilean telenovelas
Mega (Chilean TV channel) telenovelas
Spanish-language telenovelas
2016 Chilean television series debuts
2016 Chilean television series endings
2016 telenovelas